Oak Grove is a census-designated place and unincorporated community located in Lamar County, Mississippi, United States.  The settlement is a suburb located immediately west of Hattiesburg.

It was first named as a CDP in the 2020 Census which listed a population of 1,758.

History
Oak Grove experienced a growth in its population beginning in the 1970s as families from nearby Hattiesburg moved to the community.  Schools, churches, businesses and newspapers were established, as were "the seeds of a long-running dispute about incorporation versus annexation by Hattiesburg".

In 1987, the city of Hattiesburg filed a petition seeking to expand its corporate boundaries into Oak Grove.  In response, the "Oak Grove Concerned Citizens Association" filed a petition in favor of incorporating the City of Oak Grove.  Both petitions were denied.  In 1991, the petitions were appealed to the Supreme Court of Mississippi.  Testimony at the appeal included the following:
If you look at a map, the political boundaries removed, you will think Oak Grove a part of Hattiesburg. If you drive through the area, Oak Grove will appear residential Hattiesburg. The phone company treats Oak Grove and Hattiesburg as one, Hattiesburg being the one. The Post Office has not given Oak Grove a zip code. If you follow the average Oak Grovian around, day by day, you will find that he works, plays, shops in Hattiesburg everything but "sleeps and pays taxes," and you will wonder why Oak Grove is not politically a part of Hattiesburg.

Demographics

2020 census

Note: the US Census treats Hispanic/Latino as an ethnic category. This table excludes Latinos from the racial categories and assigns them to a separate category. Hispanics/Latinos can be of any race.

Education
Oak Grove is part of the Lamar County School District.  Schools located in or near the community include:
 Oak Grove High School
 Oak Grove Middle School 
 Oak Grove Upper Elementary 
 Oak Grove Lower Elementary 
Longleaf Elementary (in West Hattiesburg)
 Oak Grove Primary

Infrastructure
The Oak Grove Volunteer Fire Department is located in the community.

References

Unincorporated communities in Lamar County, Mississippi
Unincorporated communities in Mississippi
Census-designated places in Lamar County, Mississippi